In American Football, passer rating is a measure of the performance of passers, primarily quarterbacks. Passer rating is calculated using a player's passing attempts, completions, yards, touchdowns, and interceptions. Passer rating in the NFL is measured on a scale from 0 to 158.3, with a higher passer rating reflecting a stronger overall performance.

Since 1973, passer rating has been the official formula used by the NFL to determine its passing leader.

Passer rating is sometimes colloquially referred to as “quarterback rating” or “QB rating”, however the statistic applies only to passing (not to other contributions by a quarterback) and applies to any player at any position who throws a forward pass, not just to quarterbacks.

This is a list of National Football League quarterbacks who have led the regular season in passer rating each year. The record for highest passer rating in a season is held by Aaron Rodgers of the Green Bay Packers who had 122.5 in 2011. Steve Young has led the NFL in passer rating a record six different times, Len Dawson achieved the same feat in the AFL.

Passer rating leaders
As per the Pro Football Reference and Cold Hard Football Facts.

 Note: Minimum 10 attempts per team game (prior to 1976); 12 attempts per team game (1976–1977); 14 attempts per team game (1978–present).

Top 25 single-season passer rating

List includes qualifying players only.'' 
Season minimum:
 Prior to 1976, 10 pass attempts per team game
 1978–present, 14 pass attempts per team game

American Football League (AFL)

Most titles

See also
Passer rating
List of National Football League career passer rating leaders
List of National Football League annual passing touchdowns leaders
List of National Football League annual passing yards leaders
List of National Football League annual pass completion percentage leaders

References

Passer rating leaders
National Football League lists